The Taleides Painter was an Attic vase painter of the black-figure style, active in the second half of the 6th century BC. His conventional name is derived from his close cooperation with the potter Taleides, many of whose vases he painted. He also worked for the potter Timagoras.

Works (selection)
Athens, Akropolis Museum
fragment of a loutrophoros
Athens, National Museum
lekythos 414
Berlin, Antikensammlung
Little-master cup F 1721 • psykter-oinochoe 31131
Borden Wood, Collection Mrs. Winifred Lamb
lekythos
Boston, Museum of Fine Arts
oinochoe 10.210 • amphora 63.952 • hydria 68.105 • hydria 99.522
Brunswick, Bowdoin College
fragment 2
Eleusis, Archaeological Museum
lekythos 961
Hamburg, Museum für Kunst und Gewerbe
amphora 1917.474
Limenas, Museum
cup fragment
Madrid, Museo Arqueológico Nacional
oinochoe 10932 (L 55)
Malibu, The J. Paul Getty Museum
lekythos 76.AE.48
Munich, Antikensammlung
lekythos
Oxford, Ashmolean Museum
fragment of a lekythos G 571
Paris, Musée National du Louvre
hydria Cp10655 • ‚hydria F 38 • ‚hydria F 39 • Oinochoe F 340 • oinochoe F 341
Rome, Museo Nazionale di Villa Giulia
amphora 15538 • Lekythos M 556
St. Petersburg, Hermitage
hydria 4467
Sydney, University, Nicholson Museum
 fragment of a lekythos 48.284 (former Borden Wood, Collection Mrs. Winifred Lamb)
Syracuse, Museo Archeologico Regionale Paolo Orsi
fragment of a Little-master cup 7354 • lekythos 8276
Taranto, Museo Archeologico Nazionale
lekythos 117183
Vatican, Museo Gregoriano Etrusco
Little-master cup Albizatti 321
Little-master cup 39546 (formerly Guglielmi collection)

Notes

Bibliography
John Beazley: Attic Black-Figure Vase-Painters, Oxford 1956, p. 174-176.
John Beazley: Paralipomena. Additions to Attic black-figure vase-painters and to Attic red-figure vase-painters, Oxford 1971, p. 72-74.
Peter Heesen: Taleides, in: Künstlerlexikon der Antike Vol. 2, 2004, p. 431-432.

Ancient Greek vase painters